Ludwig of Hohenlohe-Langenburg (20 October 1696 in Langenburg – 16 January 1765 in Langenburg) was a Count of Hohenlohe-Langenburg. On 7 January 1764, he was elevated to Imperial Prince by Emperor Francis I.

Life
He was a son of Count Albert Wolfgang of Hohenlohe-Langenburg and Countess Sophia Amalia of Nassau-Saarbrücken.

During Ludwig's reign as prince, some modifications to Langenburg Castle were made: the east wing was provided with its present form and further modifications in the Baroque style took place. He also built, as his summer residence, the Lustschloss Ludwigsruhe on the land of the former hamlet of Lindenbronn, next to the hunting park created in 1588.

Marriage and issue 
On 23 January 1723, he married his double first cousin, Countess Eleanor of Nassau-Saarbrücken (1707–1769). She was the daughter of Count Louis Crato of Nassau-Saarbrücken (a brother of his mother) and his wife, Countess Philippine Henriette of Hohenlohe-Langenburg (a sister of his father).
  
The marriage produced thirteen children:
 Christian Albrecht, Prince of Hohenlohe-Langenburg (1726–1789)
 Friedrich Karl (1728–1728)
 Sophie Henriette (1729–1735)
 Auguste Caroline (1731–1736)
 Luise Charlotte (1732–1777), married Christian Frederick Carl, Prince of Hohenlohe-Kirchberg
 Eleonore Juliane (1734–1813), married Prince Albert of Hohenlohe-Ingelfingen
 Wilhelm Friedrich (1736–1805)
 Philipp Karl (1738–1753)
 Friedrich August (1740–1810)
 Ludwig Gottfried (1742–1765)
 Christiane Henriette (1744–1744)
 Caroline Christiane (1746–1750)
 Friedrich Ernst (1750–1794), married Magdalena Adriana van Haren

Counts of Hohenlohe
Princes of Hohenlohe-Langenburg
House of Hohenlohe
1696 births
1765 deaths
18th-century German people
People from Langenburg